The Poulsen-Hall House, at 90 S. 100 East in Manti, Utah, was built in 1876.  It was listed on the National Register of Historic Places in 2011.

Architecture: Gothic, Greek Revival, Temple Form

It may also be known as the Niels C. & Jensene Poulsen House or the William T. & Dagmar P. Hall House.

The house has been available for vacation rental.

References

National Register of Historic Places in Sanpete County, Utah
Greek Revival architecture in Utah
Gothic Revival architecture in Utah
Houses completed in 1876